Kazantsevo is a rural locality (a selo) and the administrative center of Kazantsevskoye Rural Settlement of Romanovsky District, Altai Krai, Russia. The population was 283 in 2016. There are 8 streets.

Geography 
Kazantsevo is located 18 km northeast of Romanovo (the district's administrative centre) by road. Mamontovo is the nearest rural locality.

References 

Rural localities in Romanovsky District, Altai Krai